Cellulose acetate butyrate (CAB) is a mixed ester thermoplastic derivative of cellulose acetate that contains both acetate and butyrate functional groups. It has improved weathering resistance and lower moisture absorption compared to cellulose acetate. The exact properties of a CAB compound is determined by the composition of butyrate vs acetate functional groups.

CAB is commonly used as a binder or additive in coatings.

References 

Thermoplastics
Butyrate esters
Acetate esters